Marin Cavar (born 18 June 1999) is a Swiss footballer of Croatian descent who plays as a defender.

Club career
In 2019, Cavar signed for Italian second division side Chievo after playing for Winterthur in the Swiss second division. On 4 August 2020, he debuted for Chievo during a 1–1 draw with Empoli.

On 3 August 2021, he returned to Winterthur on a two-year contract.

On 31 August 2022, Cavar moved to Brühl on a season-long loan. On 14 January 2023, Cavar's contract with Winterthur was terminated by mutual consent.

Career statistics

References

External links
 
 

1999 births
People from Horgen
Sportspeople from the canton of Zürich
Swiss people of Croatian descent
Living people
Swiss men's footballers
Association football defenders
FC Zürich players
FC Winterthur players
A.C. ChievoVerona players
SC Brühl players
Swiss Challenge League players
Swiss Promotion League players
Swiss 1. Liga (football) players
Serie B players
Swiss expatriate footballers
Expatriate footballers in Italy
Swiss expatriate sportspeople in Italy